Martyn Andrew Cox is a British Conservative politician and Leader of Bolton Council in Greater Manchester. As Leader he is also a member of the Greater Manchester Combined Authority and is the Combined Authority's portfolio lead for culture. He is one of two members of the GMCA who is not a Labour politician.

He was first elected as a Councillor in 2003 as a Liberal Democrat in Horwich & Blackrod Ward but stood down from this role 2007. In 2010 he returned to the Council winning his current seat in the Ward of Westhoughton North and Chew Moor. He was elected as Leader of the Council in August 2021 following the death of David Greenhalgh the previous month.

References 

Living people
Conservative Party (UK) councillors
Councillors in Bolton
Leaders of local authorities of England
Year of birth missing (living people)
Members of the Greater Manchester Combined Authority